The Mishmi wren-babbler (Spelaeornis badeigularis) is a species of bird in the family Timaliidae.
It is endemic to Northeast India.

Its natural habitat is subtropical or tropical moist montane forest.
It is threatened by habitat loss. The species was first described based on a bird collected in 1947 but was not seen again until 2004, when a field trip discovered it to be moderately common in a restricted area of Mishmi Hills in Arunachal Pradesh.

References

Collar, N. J. & Robson, C. 2007. Family Timaliidae (Babblers)  pp. 70 – 291 in; del Hoyo, J., Elliott, A. & Christie, D.A. eds. Handbook of the Birds of the World, Vol. 12. Picathartes to Tits and Chickadees. Lynx Edicions, Barcelona.

External links
BirdLife Species Factsheet.

Mishmi wren-babbler
Birds of Northeast India
Mishmi wren-babbler
Taxonomy articles created by Polbot